Caffè Nero is an Italian-influenced coffeehouse company headquartered in London, England. Founded in 1997 by Gerry Ford, currently the company runs more than 1,000 coffee houses in eleven countries: the UK, Ireland, Sweden, Poland, Cyprus, Croatia, Turkey, the UAE, Oman, and the United States. In 2009 Caffè Nero bought and opened its own coffee roastery in Battersea, south London, which supplies the coffee to all its coffee houses worldwide.

Caffè Nero Ltd is majority owned, through a chain of intermediary companies, including UK-based Nero Group Holdings Ltd and Luxembourg-based Rome Intermediate Holdings Sarl, by Gerry Ford. The company successfully dismissed a hostile takeover attempt during the COVID-19 pandemic.

History
In 1997, Gerry Ford led a small group of investors in the purchase of 5 London coffee outlets. Gerry Ford subsequently completely redesigned those units, introduced gourmet coffee, and a new fresh food menu and brand identity, thereby establishing the Caffè Nero brand as recognized today. At the same time the signature coffee house blend – Classico – was introduced, and has gone on to receive awards for its quality. The Classico blend is still served in every store today.

In March 2001 Caffè Nero joined the London Stock Exchange under the symbol CFN. In early 2007, the company was the subject of a management buy-out by the newly formed Rome Bidco Ltd and taken private. The company expanded to Turkey in 2007, the UAE in 2009, Poland in 2012, Cyprus in 2013, Ireland and the United States in 2014, Croatia in 2017, Oman in 2018 and Sweden.

In 2013, Caffè Nero's coffee was rated best-tasting among five major UK brands by experts at the independent consumer magazine Which?

In June 2016, the Caffè Nero Group completed the purchase of the Harris + Hoole business from Tesco, with 43 sites, and in January 2019 the Group expanded further by completing the purchase of the majority shareholding of the 100-strong coffee chain Coffee#1 located in Wales, South West England and the Midlands from SA Brains.  The deal gave Caffe Nero a 67% majority stake in the business; in February 2022, Caffe Nero purchased the remaining 33%.

In 2020, like many businesses in the hospitality sector, Caffè Nero suffered from poor trading conditions because of the COVID-19 pandemic. Due to the second lockdown in November 2020, the company proposed entering a company voluntary arrangement (CVA) with its creditors. Ford hoped that successful renegotiation of rent agreements with landlords, and a reduction in overall costs, would enable the company to rebuild its business when the pandemic ended; more than 90% of creditors voted in favour in November 2020. The CVA was approved the day after Caffè Nero confirmed it had rejected an unsolicited takeover approach from the brothers Mohsin and Zuber Issa, who are behind the EG Group, stating that they had "clear intention" to disrupt the CVA "as a precursor to opportunistically acquiring the company at a later date."

In September 2021, the high court dismissed the challenge against the CVA, brought by a landlord with the backing of the Issa brothers, with Mr Justice Green ruling that the company had "acted in good faith, in accordance with their professional duties and reached a perfectly reasonable decision that it was not in the best interests of the creditors to postpone the CVA process".

In January 2022, Caffè Nero completed a £330m refinancing  to give it a platform for future growth and development as well as the ability to resume its new store-opening programme as the business continued its recovery from the effects of the pandemic.

In August 2022, Caffè Nero was awarded a Princess Royal Award For Outstanding Workplace Training in recognition of the impact of its workplace leader development courses.

Controversies

Some of the company's stores have had planning permission controversies or enforcement. In December 2011, councillors in Skipton accused Caffè Nero of "bully-boy tactics" following the opening of a store without the required planning permission.

 Caffè Nero had not paid any corporation tax in the UK since 2007 on sales of £2 billion and had been subject to criticism, although the BBC reported that "there is no suggestion that Caffe Nero has done anything illegal" and that "Caffe Nero has previously rejected accusations that its complex corporate structure involving various holding companies is designed to avoid corporation tax." Paul Monaghan, chief executive of the Fair Tax Mark campaign group, said the firm's tax arrangements were "parasitic" and "insulting to the intelligence of the British people".

In May 2015, the company said that they would stop serving milk from farms in Gloucestershire's badger cull areas following threats from animal-rights activists. On 29 May 2015, the company said: "Caffè Nero has instructed its partners supplying to stores which are situated around the cull zone areas to supply milk from farms outside of the zone." 

On 7 July 2015, rats were videoed scurrying along the floor and counter in their Donegall Square West unit in Belfast, despite having previously been awarded a four out of five star rating by inspectors from Belfast City Council. Having been notified of the incident, the store was closed for a full investigation and later reopened; the source of the infestation was an adjacent disused building. 

A 2017 undercover investigation by the BBC programme Watchdog found trace amounts of faecal bacteria in the iced water used for drinks in Caffè Nero, Starbucks and Costa Coffee. It was suggested that the ice was most likely to have been contaminated by being touched by unclean hands. The three major coffee chains said they were taking steps to deal with the matter. Tony Lewis, head of policy at the Chartered Institute of Environmental Health, urged caution about the BBC's findings, stating: "The public should not panic about this. You can't generalise from the small sample size."

In June 2018, Polish State Sanitary Inspectorate and media reported 63 adults and 10 children having been poisoned (21 of whom were hospitalized) after eating salmonella-contaminated cakes served in a number of Caffè Neros in Warsaw, Cracow and Wrocław.

See also

 List of coffeehouse chains

References

External links

Official website

Coffeehouses and cafés in the United Kingdom
Restaurants established in 1997
Coffee brands